Falcatakely (meaning "small scythe" from the Latin falcatus and Malagasy kely, in reference to the shape of the beak) is an extinct genus of enantiornithean bird known from partial fossils from northern Madagascar. The genus contains a single species, Falcatakely forsterae.

Description 
Falcatakely is a crow-sized stem-bird that can be distinguished from all other enantiornitheans by its deep, long rostrum approx. 9 centimetres (3.5 inch) in length, which is slightly reminiscent of that of a toucan.

Classification 
The describers' phylogenetic analyses all place Falcatakely in the Enantiornithes, though its precise position is unclear. It has been recovered as a basal enantiornithean, the sister taxon of Pengornis, and in a polytomy with many other enantiornitheans.

Paleoenvironment 
Falcatakely is known from the Maevarano Formation, then a swampy floodplain which seasonally alternated between being swampland in the wet season and dry semidesert during the dry season; it was home to other unusual animals such as Simosuchus, a herbivorous crocodilian, Masiakasaurus, a short-armed, buck-toothed theropod, and Adalatherium, a highly unusual stem-mammal. These forms may have evolved due to Madagascar being an isolated island during the Cretaceous.

References 

Enantiornitheans
Fossil taxa described in 2020